Dan Fabian (born June 28, 1954) is an American politician who served as a Republican member of the Minnesota House of Representatives for District 1A from 2015-2019 and as Minority Whip from 2019-2021. He represented all of Kittson, Roseau, and Marshall Counties, as well as portions of Pennington County in the northwestern part of Minnesota.

Education and career
In 1972, Fabian graduated from Fargo South High School in Fargo, North Dakota. In 1976, he graduated from Concordia College in Moorhead, receiving a B.A. in Biology, Health, and Physical Education. In 1989, Fabian earned his M.A in Education and Physical Education from North Dakota State University in Fargo. He has been at teacher at Roseau High School in Roseau since 1976.  Fabian is the track and cross country coach as well. He is also a crop hail insurance claims adjuster.
Active in his community, he is a member of the Roseau Lions Club, secretary of the Roseau Youth Hockey Association, a member of the Northland Range and Gun Club, a volunteer youth coach, a member of his church council, and a member of the National Rifle Association. He is also a board member of the Minnesota State High School League Region 8A Committee.

Minnesota House of Representatives

Elections
Fabian was first elected to the House in 2010 and re-elected in 2012, 2014, 2016 and 2018. He did not run for re-election in 2020 and was succeeded by John Burkel. In 2021, Fabian was elected the mayor of Roseau, Minnesota.

Committee assignments
For the 89th Legislative Session, Fabian is a part of the: 
Agriculture Finance Committee
Job Growth and Energy Affordability Policy and Finance Committee
Vice-Chair of the Environment and Natural Resources Policy and Finance Committee.

For the 88th Legislative Session, Fabian was a part of the: 
Environment and Natural Resources Policy Committee 
Environment, Natural Resources and Agriculture Finance Committee
Jobs and Economic Development Finance and Policy Committee

For the 87th Legislative Session, Fabian was a part of the:
Capital Investment Committee 
Education Finance Committee
Environment, Energy and Natural Resources Policy and Finance Committee
Redistricting Committee

Tenure
Fabian was sworn in on January 4, 2011. On January 6, 2015 he became the Majority Whip.

Personal life
Fabian is married to his wife Roxanne. They have 3 adult sons: Mark, Erik, and Jason. They also have 4 grandchildren.

References

External links

 Rep. Fabian Web Page
 Project Votesmart - Rep. Dan Fabian Profile
 Dan Fabian Campaign Web Site

1954 births
Living people
Politicians from Fargo, North Dakota
American Lutherans
Mayors of places in Minnesota
Republican Party members of the Minnesota House of Representatives
People from Roseau, Minnesota
21st-century American politicians